Brian Trevor John Murphy (born 25 September 1932) is an English actor and comedian. He is best known as the henpecked husband George Roper in the popular sitcom Man About the House and its spin-off series George and Mildred, and as Alvin Smedley in Last of the Summer Wine. Other notable roles include Stan the shopkeeper in the 1990s children's series Wizadora and in comedy drama series The Booze Cruise.

Life and career
Murphy was born on 25 September 1932 in Ventnor, Isle of Wight, the son of grocer's assistant Gerald Murphy and his wife Mabel, both of whom later became restaurateurs. His two brothers Ken and Eric died during active service in the Second World War. He was called up to do his national service at RAF Northwood, where he met future The Good Life actor Richard Briers. On leaving the RAF the two aspiring actors both performed in productions by the Dramatic Society at the Borough Polytechnic Institute, now London South Bank University. Murphy was a member of Joan Littlewood's Theatre Workshop (alongside Yootha Joyce), and a jobbing actor in the 1960s and early 1970s, combining his theatre work with appearances in television shows such as The Avengers, Z-Cars, Callan and Dixon of Dock Green, before being cast in the role which would make him a household name.

In Man About the House, Murphy played the lazy George Roper, whose wife, Mildred, was played by Yootha Joyce. Her domineering, social-climbing characteristic was a sharp contrast to George's desire for an easy and quiet life and the pairing was an instant hit. A contributing factor to their immediate chemistry was that they had been friends for many years. Aside from their Theatre Workshop years, Murphy also featured in Sparrows Can't Sing (1963) with Joyce and other Theatre Workshop colleagues, including Barbara Windsor.

When Man About The House ended in 1976, a spin-off was created for Murphy and Joyce, entitled George and Mildred. This ran for five series until 1979. In 1978 he released the single 'Jogging' (B Side 'The Great Gnome Robbery') on the Pye Records Label. Murphy reprised his role in feature films of both sitcoms. Joyce died in 1980, and the planned final series of George and Mildred was cancelled. The following year, another sitcom was created for Murphy with him in the title role in The Incredible Mr. Tanner along with Man About The House and George and Mildred co-star Roy Kinnear, but the show failed to gain popularity. He moved to the BBC in 1982 for the driving school sitcom L For Lester, but this was also a ratings failure and was cancelled after just six episodes.

Murphy was the subject of This Is Your Life in 1997.

Murphy continued to appear regularly on television, most notably as "Alvin Smedley" in Last of the Summer Wine from 2003 to 2010, that was promoted by a cast return to Rose Theatre site and also with roles in On Your Way, Riley (1985) as Arthur Lucan, Lame Ducks (as a private investigator); The Bill (as a drunken tramp dressed as an elf at Christmas); comedy series Pond Life, an animation series, as Len Pond, the father of protagonist Dolly Pond (Sarah Ann Kennedy), One Foot in the Grave starring Richard Wilson (playing a character called Mr Foskett); Brookside; and as a shopkeeper called Stan in the pre-school children's TV series Wizadora. In 2010 he appeared in an episode of Hustle called "The Thieving Mistake". He has more recently made appearances in comedy shows The Catherine Tate Show, This is Jinsy and Benidorm. Murphy can also be seen in all three episodes of the ITV comedy The Booze Cruise, playing Maurice. He also appeared as Frank Dobson in The Cafe from 2011 and 2013. He also appeared in the Channel 4 comedy Man Down as music teacher Frank Field-Williams in the 2013 Christmas special.

Personal life
Murphy married his second wife, Hi-de-Hi! actress Linda Regan, in 1995; they live in Kent. Murphy has two adult children, Trevor and Kevin, from his previous marriage to Carol Gibson. His grandson is the playwright Martin Murphy, whose play Manor was performed at the Tristan Bates Theatre in Covent Garden in 2010.

Theatre
 Sweeney Todd, The Demon Barber of Fleet Street (Christopher Bond), Theatre Royal Stratford East, Title role (Sweeney Todd), 1973
 On Your Way, Riley (Alan Plater), The Queen's Theatre, Arthur Lucan (Old Mother Riley), February–March 1983
 When We Are Married (J.B. Priestley), Whitehall Theatre, Herbert Soppitt, 1986
 Roll on Friday (Roger Hall), Watford Palace Theatre, Jim, October 1989

Radio
From October 1987 to July 1991, Murphy played Ernest Bond in BBC Radio 4's drama series Citizens.

Murphy also played Robert Collins in an episode of the audio series of Doctor Who by Big Finish Productions in an episode entitled "The Home Guard" in November 2019.

Filmography

Film

Television

References

External links
 
 
 Brian Murphy role reviews

1932 births
Military personnel from the Isle of Wight
20th-century Royal Air Force personnel
Royal Air Force airmen
20th-century English male actors
21st-century English male actors
British male comedy actors
English male film actors
English male radio actors
English male stage actors
English male television actors
Living people
Male actors from Kent
People from Shortlands
People from Ventnor